Kibler is a city in Crawford County, Arkansas, United States. It is part of the Fort Smith, Arkansas-Oklahoma Metropolitan Statistical Area. As of the 2010 Census the population was 961.

Geography

Demographics

As of the census of 2000, there were 969 people, 343 households, and 278 families residing in the city. The racial makeup of the city was 95.25% White, 0.10% Black or African American, 1.44% Native American, 1.86% Asian, 0.62% from other races, and 0.72% from two or more races.  1.44% of the population were Hispanic or Latino of any race.

There were 343 households, out of which 35.9% had children under the age of 18 living with them, 65.9% were married couples living together, 11.4% had a female householder with no husband present, and 18.7% were non-families. 16.9% of all households were made up of individuals, and 7.6% had someone living alone who was 65 years of age or older.  The average household size was 2.83 and the average family size was 3.16.

In the city, the population was spread out, with 27.7% under the age of 18, 9.5% from 18 to 24, 26.6% from 25 to 44, 25.3% from 45 to 64, and 10.9% who were 65 years of age or older.  The median age was 37 years. For every 100 females, there were 99.4 males.  For every 100 females age 18 and over, there were 98.6 males.

The median income for a household in the city was $33,889, and the median income for a family was $36,761. Males had a median income of $27,955 versus $19,583 for females. The per capita income for the city was $15,763.  About 11.3% of families and 14.8% of the population were below the poverty line, including 22.4% of those under age 18 and 21.9% of those age 65 or over.

References

Cities in Arkansas
Cities in Crawford County, Arkansas
Fort Smith metropolitan area